Paul Hansen may refer to:

 Paul Hansen (basketball) (1928-1993), College basketball coach
 Paul Hansen (photographer) (born 1964), Swedish photographer
 Paul Hansen (tenor) (1886–1967), Danish opera singer and film actor